Guglielmo Aretini-Sillani (18 August 1786 − 12 August 1875) was an Italian Roman Catholic bishop.

Ordained to the priesthood on 12 June 1813, Aretini-Sillani was named bishop of the Roman Catholic Diocese of Latina-Terracina-Sezze-Priverno, Mexico in April 1835 and resigned on 4 December 1853.

See also
Catholic Church in Mexico

References

1786 births
1875 deaths
People from the Province of Perugia
19th-century Italian Roman Catholic bishops